Meenad  is a village in Kollam district in the state of Kerala, India. It is just 6 km away from Paravur.

Demographics
 India census, Meenad had a population of 29,497 with 14,087 males and 15,410 females.

Transport

Meenad is well connected with Paravur and Chathannoor. The well furnished Paravur-Chathannoor road is passing through Meenad. The proximity of this place to Paravur Railway Station and National Highway 47 makes Meenad a major residential area in the district.

Paravur Railway Station is an 'Adersh Railway Station', so a good number of important daily trains have halts here.

References

Villages in Kollam district